Rise Again: A Group Singing Songbook is a sequel to the popular folk music fake book Rise Up Singing, containing chords, lyrics, and sources.  There are 1200 completely new songs in the 2015 edition. Compiled by Annie Patterson and Peter Blood.  Released in 2016 by Hal Leonard Books.

Songs in Rise Again are grouped by chapters just as in Rise Up Singing. Chapters are arranged alphabetically, as are songs within chapters.

Some chapters have the same titles as in Rise Up Singing, but some chapter titles are different. The main change is that the new songbook has a number of new song genre chapters reflecting the inclusion of more songs from genres other than folk music. There are now whole chapters devoted to blues, country music, jazz, early rock & roll, British rock, Motown, and other US rock (including a chapter focusing on "millennial" popular songs written since 1995).

Pete Seeger, who wrote the introduction to Rise Up Singing, wrote a moving preface to Rise Again a year before he died.  Billy Bragg wrote the foreword to Rise Again.

Origin
Work began on a sequel in 1998. Seeger was a member of the initial song selection committee. He originally proposed to Blood and Patterson that they take the new book to Hal Leonard, when it became clear that Sing Out! would be unable to complete the project.

A large community of volunteers helped to create Rise Again, just as had happened with Rise Up Singing and its prequel Winds of the People. Although the new collection remains weighted towards folk music, the new book includes full chapters of standards from many musical genres including blues, country, bluegrass music, Motown, Broadway show tunes, and Alternative-Indie songs. A number of experts lent advice on particular genres including Mary Flower (for blues) and John Roberts (musician) (for English traditional songs), and Joe Offer (one of the moderators of the Mudcat Café), and Johanna Halbeisen (curator of the New Song Library).

Content
Rise Again contains words and chords to 1200 songs. There is no overlap with the songs in Rise Up Singing. As in Rise Up Singing, songs include words and chords only. Music is included only for rounds.  Rise Again includes three indices - by recording artist, by culture and special genres, and by title.

Format
The format to Rise Again Songbook is very similar to Rise Up Singing. The book is spiral-bound with a sturdy cover. Bookstores also sell a paperback version.  It is available in both 7 1/2"x10" and a larger 9"x12" format. Both versions are identical in content. Songs are grouped into 39 chapters by song genre or subject matter. Songs are alphabetized by title within each chapter. The chapters themselves are also sorted alphabetically.  Chords are written out (as in Rise Up Singing) under the first verse, the chorus and any other section of the song (i.e. bridge). Type fonts are larger than in Rise Up Singing due to narrower margins and other adjustments to increase legibility in both the 7 1/2x10 and the 9x12 formats.

The book includes hand-drawn illustrations. The cover drawing is by Mary Azarian. The large banner illustrations at the beginning of each chapter are the book's co-editor Annie Patterson. Interior chapter drawings are by Annie, Meghan Merker (who was the main illustrator for Sing Out! Magazine for over 30 years) or by Mona Shiber.

Since the book only includes lyrics and chords without notation (only rounds include notation), it is relatively compact in size and also relatively inexpensive.

As an aid to learning the melodies in the book, links to YouTube recordings of all 1200 songs in Rise Again can be found on Patterson and Blood's website.  Another great way to learn tunes to songs is by attending any of the scores of monthly sings (singalongs) across the U.S. and Canada where groups gather to sing selections from Rise Up Singing and Rise Again Songbook.

In the United States and Canada, there are monthly sings (singalongs) where groups gather to sing selections from Rise Up Singing and Rise Again.

See also
 Deep Community
 Rise Up Singing

References

External links
 The Music Box Online Song Database provides links to Wikipedia articles (where available) on hundreds of the songs included in Rise Again.

Folk music publications
Song books
2016 books
Sing-along